Robert Cray Drummond (1898 – after 1927) was a Scottish professional association footballer who played as an inside forward.

References

1898 births
Year of death unknown
Footballers from Edinburgh
Scottish footballers
Association football forwards
Burnley F.C. players
Bristol City F.C. players
English Football League players